Rozhnama is a Kurdish daily newspaper, it hopes to become the first Kurdish newspaper of record.

Rozhnama was founded in 2007 at the behest of Nawshirwan Mustafa, who claimed he wanted a daily newspaper in the Kurdistan region which had complete editorial independence. The newspaper is printed using the latest Heidelberg press.

References 

BBC NEWS, Middle East, Guide: Iraq's Kurdish media [www.news.bbc.co.uk/2/hi/middle_east/7094973.stm]

2007 establishments in Iraq
Newspapers published in Iraq
Publications established in 2007
Mass media in Sulaymaniyah